Chang Kalagh (also Romanized as Chang Kalāgh; also known as Chīng Kalāgh) is a village in Roqicheh Rural District, Kadkan District, Torbat-e Heydarieh County, Razavi Khorasan Province, Iran. At the 2006 census, its population was 201, in 44 families.

References 

Populated places in Torbat-e Heydarieh County